"Pamela" is a song written by David Paich and Joseph Williams and performed by Toto for the 1988 Toto album The Seventh One.  It was the first US single from the album, predating its release, and it peaked at #22 on the Billboard Hot 100, becoming their final US hit to date.  It also reached #9 on the Adult Contemporary chart.

In Europe, "Pamela" was the second single, as "Stop Loving You" was selected as the lead single from the album instead.

Background
The song was written by David Paich and Joseph Williams. Paich had first written the chorus, music and words, including the name, "Pamela". Williams happened to have a friend at the time named "Pamela", and had already written a song for her by the same name. The chorus of Williams's song was used in the bridge, and Williams wrote new words and melody for the verses as well.

Cash Box called it "a beautifully conceived tune, replete with the wonderful production ideas that the band is famous for."

Personnel
Toto

 Joseph Williams – lead vocals and backing vocals
 Steve Lukather – electric guitar and backing vocals
 David Paich – synthesizers, piano and backing vocals
 Steve Porcaro – synthesizers
 Mike Porcaro – bass
 Jeff Porcaro – drums and tambourine

Additional musicians

 Tom Kelly –  backing vocals
 Tom Scott – winds arrangement

Charts

Weekly charts

Year-end charts

References

External links
 

1988 songs
1988 singles
Toto (band) songs
Columbia Records singles
Songs written by David Paich
Songs written by Joseph Williams (musician)